The First Methodist Church of St. Petersburg (also known as the First United Methodist Church of St. Petersburg) is a historic church in St. Petersburg, Florida. It is located at 212 3rd Street, North. On September 13, 1990, it was added to the U.S. National Register of Historic Places.

References

External links
 Official website
 Pinellas County listings at National Register of Historic Places
 Florida's Office of Cultural and Historical Programs
 Pinellas County listings
 First United Methodist Church of St. Petersburg

United Methodist churches in Florida
National Register of Historic Places in Pinellas County, Florida
Churches on the National Register of Historic Places in Florida
Culture of St. Petersburg, Florida
Churches in St. Petersburg, Florida
Gothic Revival church buildings in Florida
Churches completed in 1925
Churches in Pinellas County, Florida
1925 establishments in Florida